Lud, zbunjen, normalan (Crazy, confused, normal) is a Bosnian television program that revolves around three generations of men: the grandfather, Izet who is Lud (crazy), the father Faruk, who is Zbunjen (confused) and the son Damir, who is Normalan (normal) and the interaction around their neighborhood with their co workers and friends. Later on in the series, Faruk leaves for Sweden, after which Damir's son Džebra, a student, becomes the normal one in the family. Izet stays crazy, while Damir is both crazy and confused.

Ensemble cast

Overview

Main characters

Izet Fazlinović

Izet Fazlinović (Mustafa Nadarević) - Izet is a widower in his mid sixties, who was orphaned as a child. He is a staunch communist with Titoism leanings, as he always asks President Josip Broz Tito for help while looking at his picture, but is nonetheless greedy and unwilling to work for money, preferring to run scams. Izet often threatens to kill people "like rabbits" (which he did when he mistakenly believed that Damir was gay or when Faruk spilled his prized and highly alcohol, "Maksuzija" which is a rakija made in Popovo Polje by Izet's old war friend. It is revealed that Ante, Izet's provider of Maksuzija actually switches it out for a worse alcoholic drink, so that he can keep the Maksuzija for himself, and the other's he is providing) Izet is constantly yelling and browbeating everyone around him to great comic effect. In addition he makes outrageous claims (about his past love life and fighting the Germans during World War II ((going as far as saying he was on the front lines)), which occurred while he was an infant). He is considered the show's breakout character.

Faruk Fazlinović

Faruk Fazlinović (Senad Bašić) - Faruk is Izet's son and only child. He worked as a music producer and owned the fledgling studio where he worked, which lasted for a couple of seasons, but his studio was used for different purposes through the series (being used as a radio station as well as his TV Show studio). A running gag on the show was his tendency to sleep in very late. He had to contend with all his father's neuroses. He left the family in the 265th episode, going to Sweden (although it was confirmed that the character left the show due to complications with the script).

External links

Lud, zbunjen, normalan
Lists of sitcom television characters
Lists of Bosnian television series characters
Fictional Bosnian people